The Roman Catholic Archdiocese of Gagnoa is the Metropolitan See for the Ecclesiastical province of Gagnoa in Côte d'Ivoire.

History
 1956.06.25: Established as Diocese of Gagnoa from the Diocese of Daloa 
 1994.12.19: Promoted as Metropolitan Archdiocese of Gagnoa

Special churches
The seat of the archbishop is Cathédrale Sainte-Anne in Gagnoa.

Bishops

Ordinaries, in reverse chronological order
 Metropolitan Archbishops of Gagnoa (Roman rite), below
 Archbishop Joseph Yapo Aké (since 2008.11.22)
 Archbishop Barthélémy Djabla (2006.07.21 - 2008.09.15)
 Archbishop Jean-Pierre Kutwa (2001.05.15 – 2006.05.02) appointed Archbishop of Abidjan (Cardinal in 2014)
 Archbishop Noël Kokora-Tekry (1994.12.19 – 2001.05.15); see below
 Bishops of Gagnoa (Roman rite), below
 Bishop Noël Kokora-Tekry (1971.03.11 – 1994.12.19); see above
 Bishop Jean Marie Etrillard, S.M.A. (1956.07.04 – 1971.03.11)

Other priests of this diocese who became bishops
Alexis Touably Youlo (priest here, 1987–1992), appointed Bishop of Agboville in 2006
Gaspard Béby Gnéba, appointed Bishop of Man in 2007

Suffragan Dioceses
 Daloa
 Man
 San Pedro-en-Côte d'Ivoire

See also
 Roman Catholicism in Côte d'Ivoire
 List of Roman Catholic dioceses in Côte d'Ivoire

Sources
 GCatholic.org

Gagnoa
Gôh-Djiboua District
Gagnoa
A